Giannotti is an Italian surname. Notable people with the surname include:

 Claudia Giannotti (1937 – 2020), Italian film and television actress
 Donato Giannotti (1492–1573), Italian political writer and playwright
 Francesco Maria Giannotti (1635–1699), Roman Catholic prelate and Bishop of Segni 
 Maurilio Giannotti (died 1505), Roman Catholic prelate and Bishop of Calvi Risorta
 Pasquale Giannotti (born 1999), Italian football player
 

Italian-language surnames
Patronymic surnames
Surnames from given names